Savino Rebek (born 13 November 1940) is an Italian rower. He competed in the men's single sculls event at the 1960 Summer Olympics.

References

1940 births
Living people
Italian male rowers
Olympic rowers of Italy
Rowers at the 1960 Summer Olympics
Sportspeople from Trieste